Heather Surprenant is an American farmer and politician who serves in the Vermont House of Representatives from the Windsor-4-1 district as a member of the Vermont Progressive Party.

Early life and education

Heather Surprenant was born in Randolph, Vermont. She graduated from Smith College with a Bachelor of Arts degree in government. She lived in San Francisco, California, for two years after graduating from Smith College and then moved back to Vermont. During her time in California she worked at an organic farm in Half Moon Bay, California.

Vermont House of Representatives

Surprenant ran for a seat in the Vermont House of Representatives from the Windsor-4-1 district during the 2020 election. She received the Vermont Progressive nomination and defeated Havah Armstrong Walther for the Democratic nomination. During the campaign she was endorsed by Senator Bernie Sanders. She won in the general election against Republican nominee Mark Donka.

Electoral history

Personal
She identifies as LGBTQ.

References

External links
Campaign website

21st-century American politicians
21st-century American women politicians
Living people
Democratic Party members of the Vermont House of Representatives
Smith College alumni
Women state legislators in Vermont
Vermont Progressive Party politicians
Year of birth missing (living people)
LGBT state legislators in Vermont